The Diocese of Clogher is an ecclesiastical jurisdiction recognized by the Church of Ireland and Roman Catholic Church:

Diocese of Clogher (Roman Catholic)
Diocese of Clogher (Church of Ireland)

 See also
Bishop of Clogher, the pre-Reformation, Church of Ireland and Roman Catholic bishops